Charlotte School of Law (Charlotte Law) was an independent for-profit college in Charlotte, North Carolina established in 2006. It was provisionally accredited by the American Bar Association (ABA) in 2008, and fully accredited in 2011. However, the ABA placed the school on probation in 2016, resulting in the school's closure the following year. While Charlotte Law served the community through expungement programs and restitution self-help clinics, it was also criticized for alleged mismanagement and compliance issues, which were later found to be true. Charlotte Law was owned by the InfiLaw System.

History
Charlotte Law was established in 2006 and initially accredited two years later. In November 2016, Charlotte School of Law was placed on probation by the ABA, which cited compliance issues tied to the school’s admission policies and practices, including admitting applicants "who do not appear capable of satisfactorily completing its educational program and being admitted to the bar". On December 19, 2016, Charlotte School of Law lost its authority from the U.S. Department of Education to participate in the Federal Student Loan program. In January 2017 the school started a food bank and a "go fund me" project to help students who could not afford housing and groceries. Many students were forced to use Mecklenburg County services and crisis assistance to maintain housing, while the school offered them a loan in the amount of $1,000.

On February 7, 2017, the Charlotte School of Law Alumni Association wrote to Dean Jay Conison and President Chidi Ogene demanding their resignations.  The Alumni Association noted the falling admission standards, decreasing bar passage rates, and dismal employment prospects for graduates under Conison and Ogene's leadership.  In addition, the Alumni Association decried what they deemed the misrepresentations and mismanagement of the administration "motivated first by profit and not the best interests of its students, faculty, and alumni."

More than 150 students and former students have filed lawsuits against Charlotte School of Law alleging fraud, violations of the North Carolina Deceptive Trade Practices Act, and other claims.  The students claim that "money ruled, not education.  And they left a lot of poor folks holding the bag."  Faculty recently laid off by the school are also considering wrongful termination lawsuits.

Beginning on June 21, 2017, the school operated on a restricted license. The required contingencies were not met, and the school's license expired on August 10, 2017. On August 15, 2017, the New York Times reported that the North Carolina attorney general had confirmed that Charlotte School of Law had closed. Students and alumni were first notified of the closure by the President of the Alumni Association rather than the school's administration.

Since its closure, the school and the circumstances surrounding its operation and loss of accreditation have been the subject of extensive litigation. A class action was instituted against the school by former students, resulting in a controversial $2.65 million dollar settlement for as many as 2,500 former students. More than 70 students objected to the settlement amount. A second suit has been instituted in Illinois against Sterling Partners, the Hedge Fund that owns InfiLaw. In turn, the school has filed suit against the ABA, arguing that the ABA's decision to revoke its accreditation was made improperly and violated its right to Due Process.

Campus

Charlotte School of Law was located at 201 South College Street in Uptown Charlotte. The building contained classrooms, the school's law library, an appellate courtroom, offices, and the school bookstore.

Academics

Charlotte Law School admitted 64% of applicants during the 2015-2016 application cycle.  The Fall 2016 entering class had a median GPA of 2.80 and a median LSAT score of 144 (22nd percentile of LSAT takers). During the 2015-2016 academic year, 130 first year students (36% of the class) failed out of Charlotte Law School.

Charlotte School of Law offered conditional scholarships to certain incoming students. The scholarships required students to maintain a specific GPA rather than remain in good standing. Courses at Charlotte were graded on a curve with a low median GPA. Because conditional scholarship students were placed together in courses with strict grade curves, there was a risk that a large percentage of students would fail to maintain the required GPA to keep their scholarships. As a result, scholarship students lost their scholarships and were required to pay tuition to the school in subsequent semesters to continue their studies, allowing the school to increase revenues. During the 2015-2016 academic year, 155 out of 264 (59%) Charlotte School of Law scholarship students had their conditional scholarships reduced or eliminated.

In January 2017, the school laid off numerous faculty and staff because the federal government had terminated the school's participation in the federal student loan program.

Bar examination passage 
While 84.3% of Charlotte School of Law graduates passed the bar exam in 2010, which was the 2nd highest rate out of the 7 law schools in North Carolina at the time, only 45.2% of those taking the bar exam for the first time passed the July 2016 North Carolina bar exam. Charlotte graduates performed 20% worse than the North Carolina state average. Since 2010, Charlotte Law School's July bar passage rate decreased every year. The declining bar passage rate coincided with the school's drop in admission standards to maintain enrollment.  In an attempt to bolster the bar passage rate and protect the school's accreditation, the school began paying students in 2014 to delay taking the bar exam.

On January 24, 2017, a secret recording was released of a Charlotte School of Law faculty meeting. Assistant Dean Odessa Alm pushed faculty present at the meeting to advise students to forgo taking the bar exam in exchange for payments of $11,200 from the school. Dean Alm told the faculty, "[y]ou know if we didn't have the extended program last time...our pass rate would have been 20-something percent....didn't you feel so f***ing bad when we had 42 percent pass the bar."

Initiatives

Charlotte School of Law students were able to participate in the Moot Court Program. Members of the Charlotte School of Law’s Moot Court Board were selected through an intra-school competition organized and run by students and judged by members of the legal community. The intra-school competition was named after Susie Marshall Sharp, North Carolina’s first female state Supreme Court Chief Justice.

The Charlotte Law Review, a student-edited scholarly legal journal, published two issues yearly, a Spring and a Fall Journal, with plans of publishing its first Symposium Edition. The Law Review accepted manuscripts for consideration from sources both within and outside the Charlotte Law School community.

Student organizations

Student Bar Association - Executive
Student Bar Association - Senate
Phi Alpha Delta
Women in Law
CharlotteLaw Cares
CharlotteLaw Diversity Alliance
LGBT Legal Society
Federalist Society
Part-Time Student Association
International Law Society
American Constitution Society
Environmental Legal Society
Moot Court
Law Review
CharlotteLaw Republican Society
CharlotteLaw Global Poker & Strategic
CharlotteLaw Sports & Entertainment
Black Law Student Association
Real Estate Law Society
Order of the Crown (Scholastic Leadership Society)
Parents Attending Law School
National Native American Law Students Association

Employment 
According to Charlotte's official 2015 ABA-required disclosures, 26% of the Class of 2015 obtained full-time, long-term, bar passage required employment nine months after graduation. 24% of graduates were unemployed 9 months after graduation. 2% of graduates worked in non-professional jobs. 34% of graduates were employed in short term or part-time jobs. Charlotte's Law School Transparency under-employment score was 37.7%, indicating the percentage of the Class of 2013 unemployed, pursuing an additional degree, or working in a non-professional, short-term, or part-time job nine months after graduation.

Costs
The total cost of attendance (indicating the cost of tuition, fees, and living expenses) at Charlotte for the 2013-2014 academic year was $41,000. The Law School Transparency estimated debt-financed cost of attendance for three years was $194,000.

References

External links
Charlotte School of Law

Law schools in North Carolina
Educational institutions established in 2006
Former for-profit universities and colleges in the United States
Independent law schools in the United States
Universities and colleges in Charlotte, North Carolina
2006 establishments in North Carolina
Educational institutions disestablished in 2017
2017 disestablishments in North Carolina
Defunct law schools